Antonio Pietro Paolo Virdis (born 26 June 1957) is an Italian football manager and former player, who played as a forward. Throughout his career, he played for Nuorese, before playing in Serie A with Cagliari Calcio, Juventus, Udinese Calcio, and A.C. Milan; he ended his career with Lecce. Known for his eye for goal, with Juventus, he won two league titles and a Coppa Italia; with Milan, he was the league's top scorer in 1987, also winning a league title and the Supercoppa Italiana in 1988, and was part of the club's European Cup victory in 1989. At international level, he represented Italy at the 1988 Summer Olympics, helping the team to a fourth-place finish.

Club career
Born in Sassari, Italy, Virdis started his career in his native Sardinia with amateur Serie D side Nuorese in 1973, scoring 11 goals in his first senior season at the young age of 16. He later joined Cagliari, making his Serie A debut on 6 October 1974 in a league game versus Lanerossi Vicenza.

In 1977, he joined Juventus, where he played until 1982, except for a one-year stint back at Cagliari in 1980–81. After failing to find a first team place, in 1982 he left Juventus for Udinese. In 1984, he then moved at A.C. Milan, where he enjoyed his best period at club level. He made his Serie A debut with the club in a 2–1 away defeat to Parma on 22 August 1984, and he played five seasons with the rossoneri, winning the Serie A top-scorer title during the 1986–87 season, with 17 goals; he also won the 1987–88 Serie A title, and the 1988 Supercoppa Italiana with the club, followed by the 1988–89 European Cup. In total, he made 186 appearances for Milan, scoring 76 goals, 53 of which were scored in Serie A in 135 appearances. In 1989, aged 32, he left AC Milan to join Lecce, where he spent his final two seasons as a professional footballer before retiring in 1991.

International career
Although he never gained a cap for the senior squad, he helped the Italian Olympic team qualify for Seoul 1988. In the tournament, he went on to score three goals in six matches as Italy reached the semi-finals, losing out 2–0 to West Germany in the bronze medal final. Before this he competed in the 1982 UEFA European Under-21 Football Championship with the Italy U21 national team.

Managerial career
After retiring from active football, Virdis tried to pursue a career as a manager. In November 1998 he took his first managerial role, becoming head coach of Serie C1 club Atletico Catania, being however fired later in April 1999.

He then returned into management in March 2001, accepting an offer from Viterbese of Serie C1. However, his stint lasted a mere two months, as he was fired in May of that year. In April 2002 he then accepted a managerial role at Nocerina, leading the team for the final few weeks of the season.

He later left football and opened a restaurant and wine bar in Milan. However, in July 2008 he stated his interest in getting back into management.

Career statistics

Honours
Juventus
Serie A: 1977–78, 1981–82
Coppa Italia: 1978–79

A.C. Milan
Serie A: 1987–88
Supercoppa Italiana: 1988
European Cup: 1988–89

Individual
Serie A top scorer: 1986–87
A.C. Milan Hall of Fame

References

External links
 Virdis profile at rsssf.com

1957 births
Living people
People from Sassari
Footballers from Sardinia
Association football forwards
Italy under-21 international footballers
Footballers at the 1988 Summer Olympics
Olympic footballers of Italy
Italian footballers
Italian football managers
A.C. Milan players
Cagliari Calcio players
Juventus F.C. players
Udinese Calcio players
U.S. Lecce players
Nuorese Calcio players
Serie A players
Serie B players
Serie D players